{{Short 
description|Indian lawyer, civil servant and administrator}}

Rao Bahadur Pattar Shangumani Narayana Iyer (born October 1898) was an Indian lawyer, civil servant and administrator who served as the Diwan of Cochin kingdom from 1925 to 1930.

Early life and education 

Narayana Iyer was born to T. Subramnia Iyer of Tarakat in October 1898. Subramania Iyer had served as Government Pleader in Trichur. Narayana Iyer matriculated from the CMS High School, Trichur. Narayana Iyer, later, graduated in law and practised as a lawyer.

Career 

Narayana served as a judge of the Cochin High Court before being appointed Chief Justice of the Cochin Court. While serving as Chief Justice of Cochin, he was appointed Diwan of the princely state.

Diwan 

As Diwan, Narayana Iyer presided over the first session of the Cochin Legislative Council. He was also responsible for the construction of water pipelines to Trichur, Mattancheri, Nemmara and Ayalore.

References 

 

1898 births
Year of death missing
20th-century Indian lawyers
Diwans of Cochin
Politicians from Thrissur
20th-century Indian politicians